Gneisenau may refer to:

 August von Gneisenau (1760–1831), Prussian field marshal
 Bruno Neidhardt von Gneisenau (1811-1889), Prussian general
 One of the German naval ships named after him:
 , iron-hulled three-masted frigate, wrecked in 1900
 , World War I armoured cruiser, launched in 1906 and sunk in 1914
 , a Norddeutscher Lloyd ocean liner, scrapped in 1950
 , a World War II battleship launched in 1936 and scuttled as a blockship in 1945; sister ship to Scharnhorst
 , an ex-British training frigate sold to West German Navy in 1957 and scrapped in 1977.
Operation Gneisenau, part of the 1918 German Spring Offensive in World War I
Gneisenaustraße (Berlin U-Bahn), station on the Berliner U-Bahn (underground railway)